Dilshad Meriwani (March 28, 1947 – March 13, 1989) was an influential Kurdish poet, actor, writer, songwriter, and film director as well as a historian and activist who was executed by the Iraqi government during Saddam Hussein era on March 13, 1989 for teaching Kurdish language in Latin alphabets. He was born in the city of Sulaimani in Iraqi Kurdistan.

Kurdish poets
1947 births
1989 deaths
Kurdish male actors
20th-century executions by Iraq
Iraqi activists
Executed Iraqi people
Executed Kurdish people
20th-century poets
20th-century Iraqi male actors